CFRNA ("The French-Romanian Company for Air Transport";) was a French–Romanian airline, founded on 1 January 1920. Its name changed on 1 January 1925 to CIDNA ("The International Air Navigation Company").

Using French-built Potez aircraft, the company provided passenger, mail and cargo transportation, by air, from Paris to Bucharest, via Strasbourg, Prague, Vienna and Budapest. As such, CFRNA was the first operative transcontinental airline in the history of aviation. The company also made the first passenger international night flight, between Belgrade and Bucharest in 1923. In 1925 CIDNA opened the first domestic Romanian route Bucharest – Galați, followed, from 24 June 1926, by an extended service to Iași and Chișinău and to Bălți.

In 1930, the Romanian arm adopted the name  (Liniile Aeriene Române Exploatate de Stat – State-Run Romanian Air Lines), which further became TAROM. The company ceased to exist when it became one of the constituting companies of Air France on 7 October 1933.

Aircraft

Gallery

References

External links
 CFRNA
 CIDNA - Compagnie Internationale de Navigation Aérienne
 History of Aviation in Romania
 The Story of the Orient Arrow

Defunct airlines of France
Defunct airlines of Romania
Airlines established in 1920
Airlines disestablished in 1933
French companies established in 1920